Darboux's theorem is a theorem in the mathematical field of differential geometry and more specifically differential forms, partially generalizing the Frobenius integration theorem.  It is a foundational result in several fields, the chief among them being symplectic geometry.  The theorem is named after Jean Gaston Darboux who established it as the solution of the Pfaff problem.

One of the many consequences of the theorem is that any two symplectic manifolds of the same dimension are locally symplectomorphic to one another. That is, every 2n-dimensional symplectic manifold can be made to look locally like the linear symplectic space Cn with its canonical symplectic form.  There is also an analogous consequence of the theorem as applied to contact geometry.

Statement and first consequences
The precise statement is as follows.  Suppose that  is a differential 1-form on an n dimensional manifold, such that  has constant rank p. If
 everywhere,
then there is a local system of coordinates  in which
.
If, on the other hand,
  everywhere,
then there is a local system of coordinates ' in which
 .
Note that if  everywhere and  then  is a contact form.

Moreover,  satisfies the first set of hypotheses in Darboux's theorem, and so locally there is a coordinate chart U near p in which
 .
Taking an exterior derivative now shows
  
The chart U is said to be a Darboux chart around p. The manifold M can be covered by such charts.

If is a Darboux chart, then  is the pullback of the standard symplectic form  on :

Comparison with Riemannian geometry

This result implies that there are no local invariants in symplectic geometry: a Darboux basis can always be taken, valid near any given point. This is in marked contrast to the situation in Riemannian geometry where the curvature is a local invariant, an obstruction to the metric being locally a sum of squares of coordinate differentials.

The difference is that Darboux's theorem states that ω can be made to take the standard form in an entire neighborhood around p. In Riemannian geometry, the metric can always be made to take the standard form at any given point, but not always in a neighborhood around that point.

The Darboux-Weinstein theorem
Alan Weinstein showed that the Darboux theorem can be strengthened to hold on a neighborhood of a submanifold :

Theorem (Darboux-Weinstein).

This theorem also holds for infinite-dimensional Banach manifolds.

See also

Carathéodory–Jacobi–Lie theorem, a generalization of this theorem.
Symplectic basis

Notes

References

External links
 G. Darboux, "On the Pfaff Problem," transl. by D. H. Delphenich
 G. Darboux, "On the Pfaff Problem (cont.)," transl. by D. H. Delphenich

Differential systems
Symplectic geometry
Coordinate systems in differential geometry
Theorems in differential geometry
Mathematical physics